Ostbevern is a railway station located 4 km North West of Ostbevern, Germany.

History

The station is located on the Wanne-Eickel–Hamburg railway line. The train services are operated by WestfalenBahn.

Train services
The following services currently call at Ostbevern:

See also

Railway stations in North Rhine-Westphalia